Visangamanaya (Isolation) is an upcoming Sri Lankan Sinhala drama film directed by Ranjan Prasanna and produced by Mahesh Wijeratne for Sinem Entertainments. It stars Ashan Dias and Semini Iddamalgoda in lead roles along with Samanalee Fonseka and Udith Abeyratne. Music composed by Samantha Perera.

Cast
 Ashan Dias as Jagath Dissanayake
 Semini Iddamalgoda as Rukshani
 Samanalee Fonseka as Esha
 Udith Abeyratne
 Douglas Ranasinghe as Dissanayake principal, Jagath's father
 Hyacinth Wijeratne as Jagath's mother
 Elroy Amalathas as Doctor Sharma
 Niroshan Wijesinghe
 Chinthaka Kulatunga
 Charith Abeysinghe
 Ishan Mendis
 Gamini Jayalath
 Bandula Suriyabandara
 Sujeewa Karunaratne.

Awards
The film brings maiden cinematic direction of Ranjan Prasanna. The film won the second place at director's maiden film category at London's Lift-Off Film Festival. It was also selected for the final round of Tokyo Lift-Off Film Festival. In 2021, it won the Director's Debut film Award at the Stockholm City Film Festival in Sweden and then won the Best Film at the Port Blair Awards in India.

References

External links
 විසංගමනය එංගලන්තයේදී ඇගැයුමට ලක්වෙයි

Sinhala-language films
Sri Lankan drama films